Hendrik Lindepuu (born 11 November 1958 in Mõisaküla) is an Estonian translator, poet, and playwright. He has translated mainly from the Polish language.

He has established its own publishing house: Hendrik Lindepuu Kirjastus. Since 2003 the publishing house is published over 40 books.

Awards:
 2005: Cross of Merit (Poland).
 2009 and 2014: Estonian State Cultural Prize
 2009: Order of Merit of the Republic of Poland.

Selected works
 "Ei haise ega lõhna" (2002; poetry collection)
 "Haisevad ja lõhnavad. Memmed ja taadid. Slavoween" (2002, plays)

Translations

 Małgorzata Semil, Elżbieta Wysińska, "Tänapäeva teatri leksikon" (with addings by translator). SE & JS, Tallinn 1996, 422 pp
 Stanisław Ignacy Witkiewicz, "Näidendid". Eesti Draamateater 1997, 288 pp

References

Living people
1958 births
Estonian male poets
20th-century Estonian poets
21st-century Estonian poets
Estonian translators
Estonian dramatists and playwrights
People from Mulgi Parish